George Faulkner (c. 1703–1775) was an Irish printer and publisher.

George Faulkner may also refer to:

George Faulkner (cricketer) (1873–?), English cricketer
George Faulkner (footballer) (1900–1969), Australian rules footballer
George Faulkner (manufacturer) (1790–1862), supposed originator of the foundation of Owens College, Manchester
George Everett Faulkner (1855–1931), Canadian politician
George W. Faulkner (1874–1944), American politician, mayor of Pittsfield, Massachusetts
George Aubrey Faulkner (1881–1930), cricketer for South Africa
George Faulkner (ice hockey) (born 1933), Canadian ice hockey player
George Faulkner (wrestler), British Olympic wrestler

See also
George Faulkner Wetherbee (1851–1920), painter